Omar Al-Khodaim (Arabic:عمر الخديم) (born 9 December 1992) is an Emirati footballer who plays as a left back.

References

External links
 

Emirati footballers
1992 births
Living people
Dibba FC players
Emirates Club players
Al-Ittihad Kalba SC players
UAE First Division League players
UAE Pro League players
Association football fullbacks